Shatt Al-Arab University College is a private Iraqi university established in 1993 in Basrah in the south of Iraq.

Faculties 
 Faculty of Computer Science
 Faculty of English Language
 Faculty of Management 
 Faculty of Law
 Faculty of  Economics
 Faculty of Computer engineering
 Faculty of Civil engineering

Shatt Al-Arab University College was established in Basra on 10  May, 1993, under decree No. MF/568, issued by the Ministry of Higher Education and Scientific Research. It is also recognized by this Ministry.
 
The College has witnessed, since its inception, a number of developments that need to be documented to diagnose points of strength and weaknesses throughout its educational process. The aim is to push the educational process forward. Shatt Al-Arab University College seeks to raise the scientific and cultural levels, in Iraq in general and in the city of Basra in particular, by preparing qualified cadres capable of undertaking responsibility by adopting the latest administrative, accounting, legal and linguistic methods, in addition to expertise in the field of the computer.

Vision

Shatt Al-Arab University College works hard to promote the scientific and cultural standards in Iraq in general and in the city of Basra in particular, by qualifying proficient graduates working in the fields of law, accounting, business administration, computer science, English language, and computer technology engineering,

 
Message

Upgrading the theoretical and applied knowledge in accordance with the ethical, social and cultural standards of the Iraqi society.

Providing students with up - to - date academic knowledge, advanced scientific research methods, high values, and the development of the student's personality to be qualified for  innovation, challenge, leadership, self-learning, teamwork and competition locally, regionally and globally.

Developing and updating curricula in line with contemporary trends and subjecting it to periodic evaluation in accordance with international standards, taking into account local conditions.

Contributing actively in the development and promotion of the knowledge of the community and backing up scientific research that would help in preparing  specialized cadres working in  various professions and also planning  for new academic specializations.

Promoting the distinctive academic fields that characterize the College       departments.

Bolstering  cooperation between the College and other universities and colleges  in the Basra and elsewhere.

 
Objectives

Preparing qualified academic and administrative personnel capable of operating the knowledge system.

Ensuring a close connection  between the outputs of the educational and research processes and the requirements of the community and the labor market.

Graduating qualified cadres capable of acquiring, investing and employing knowledge on their own.

Enhancing e-learning by diversifying sources of knowledge through using electronic means of communication to expand the knowledge base of students.

Developing curricula through cooperation and twinning with reputable universities.

Conducting a periodic review of the curricula adopted  and making any necessary modifications that cope with the needs and requirements of the market.

Stimulating students' abilities with the aim of promoting their thinking abilities that contribute to solving societal problems.

See also 
 Private universities in Iraq

Universities in Iraq
Educational institutions established in 1993
1993 establishments in Iraq